Carol Mitchell (born ) is a former politician in Ontario, Canada. She was a Liberal member of the Legislative Assembly of Ontario from 2003 to 2011 representing the riding of Huron—Bruce. She was a cabinet minister in the government of Dalton McGuinty.

Background
Mitchell was born in Clinton, Ontario in Huron County and was educated at Fanshawe College in London, Ontario. She is a past member of Girl Guides of Canada. She worked in retailing after her graduation, and ran stores selling children's clothes in Clinton and Bayfield.

Politics
She was elected to Clinton's town council in 1993, and became its reeve later in the decade. She also served on the Huron County council, and was elected as the first reeve of the amalgamated municipality of Central Huron. She was elected as warden of Huron County in 1999 and 2000.

In the 2003 provincial election she ran as the Liberal candidate in the riding of Huron—Bruce and defeated Progressive Conservative incumbent Helen Johns, a cabinet minister, by about 3,000 votes. On October 23, 2003, she was named parliamentary assistant to Steve Peters, the Ontario Minister of Agriculture and Food. In March 2006, Mitchell was named parliamentary assistant to David Caplan, the Minister of Public Infrastructure Renewal. Upon re-election in the fall of 2007, Mitchell was named Government Caucus Chair and parliamentary assistant to the Minister of Municipal Affairs and Housing, with a concentration on Municipal Affairs.

On January 18, 2010, Mitchell was named Minister of Agriculture, Food and Rural Affairs as part of a cabinet shuffle by Premier Dalton McGuinty.

She was defeated by Progressive Conservative candidate Lisa Thompson in the 2011 election.

Cabinet positions

Electoral record

References

External links

1957 births
Women government ministers of Canada
Fanshawe College alumni
Living people
Mayors of places in Ontario
Members of the Executive Council of Ontario
Ontario Liberal Party MPPs
People from Goderich, Ontario
Women mayors of places in Ontario
Women MPPs in Ontario
21st-century Canadian politicians
21st-century Canadian women politicians